The West Moreton colonial by-election, 1866 was a by-election held on 11 September 1866 in the electoral district of West Moreton for the Queensland Legislative Assembly.

History
On 7 August 1866, the Premier of Queensland and member for West Moreton, Robert Herbert, resigned. Joseph Fleming won the resulting by-election on 11 September 1866.

See also
 Members of the Queensland Legislative Assembly, 1863–1867

References

1866 elections in Australia
Queensland state by-elections
1860s in Queensland